Julius Hjulian (March 15, 1903 – February 1, 1974) was a Swedish-American goalkeeper at the 1934 FIFA World Cup.

Career
Hjulian started his career playing in Sweden, and became Swedish champion 1921 with IFK Eskilstuna. His name was then Julius Hjulin. Hjulin emigrated in 1922 to the United States together with his brother and settled in Chicago. Hjulian returned to Europe and in 1925–26 he played with Celtic F.C. but did not make any league appearances.

Hjulian spent his career in Chicago. In 1930, he is listed as playing with Chicago Sparta. At the time, Sparta dominated the National Soccer League of Chicago and consistently won the Peel Cup. In 1934, he was playing for the Chicago Wieboldt (Wonderbolts) when they broke Sparta’s hold on the Peel Cup.  That year, he was selected as the starting goalkeeper for the U.S. national team at the 1934 FIFA World Cup. Hjulian gained his first cap when the U.S. defeated Mexico, 4–2, in a World Cup qualifier. The U.S. then lost to Italy in the first round of the World Cup by 7–1.

References

External links
 1934 Roster with hometowns
 FIFA: Julias Hjulian

1903 births
1974 deaths
American soccer players
Swedish emigrants to the United States
United States men's international soccer players
Association football goalkeepers
1934 FIFA World Cup players
National Soccer League (Chicago) players
Chicago Sparta players
IFK Eskilstuna players
Celtic F.C. players
Expatriate footballers in Scotland